Myx Music Awards 2012 is the 7th Myx music awards since it started in 2006. Unlike the other Myx Music Awards, it has no Favorite Indie category, and for the first time fans can vote online through myxph.com, Twitter and Facebook.

List of nominees and winners
Winners are in bold text

Favorite Music Video 
 "20/20" – Pupil (Director: Jason Tan) (Winner)
 "Gaano Ko Ikaw Kamahal" – Itchyworms (Director: King Palisoc)
 "Hey Daydreamer" – Somedaydream (Director: Bianca King & Envo Valdez)
 "Pangarap Lang Kita" – Parokya Ni Edgar Feat. Happee Sy (Director: Avid Liongoren)
 "Pera Pera" – Sandwich (Director: Marie Jamora)

Favorite Song 
 "20/20" – Pupil
 "Ako Na Lang" – Zia Quizon
 "Hey Daydreamer" – Somedaydream
 "Pangarap Lang Kita" – Parokya Ni Edgar feat. Happee Sy (Winner)
 "Walang Natira" – Gloc-9 Feat. Sheng Belmonte

Favorite Artist 
 Christian Bautista
 Gloc-9
 Parokya Ni Edgar (Winner)
 Somedaydream
 Yeng Constantino

Favorite Female Artist 
 Karylle
 Kyla
 Sarah Geronimo
 Yeng Constantino (Winner)
 Zia Quizon

Favorite Male Artist 
 Bamboo
 Christian Bautista
 Gloc-9 (Winner)
 Sam Concepcion
 Somedaydream

Favorite Group 
 Itchyworms
 Parokya Ni Edgar (Winner)
 Pupil
 Slapshock
 Sponge Cola

Favorite Mellow Video 
 "Hindi Kita Iiwan" – Sam Milby (Director: Treb Monteras)
 "Kay Tagal Kitang Hinintay" – Sponge Cola (Director: Yan Yuzon) (Winner)
 "Lagi" – Kiss Jane (Director: J. Pacena)
 "Wag Mo Na Munang Sabihin" – Sitti (Director: Rember Gelera)
 "Wala Na Tayo" – Bbs Feat. Kean Cipriano (Director: J. Pacena)

Favorite Rock Video 
 "20/20" – Pupil (Director: Jason Tan)
 "Halik" – Kamikazee (Director: Avid Liongoren) (Winner)
 "Ngayon Na" – Slapshock (Director: Team Manila)
 "Pera Pera" – Sandwich (Director: Marie Jamora)
 "Unbelievable" – Chicosci (Director: Tower Of Doom / Paolo Ruiz)

Favorite Urban Video 
 "Ain't A Crime" – Amber Davis (Director: Luis Daniel Tabuena)
 "Connection" – Chelo A, Q-York & Jay R (Director: Treb Monteras)
 "Elmer" – Gloc-9 Feat. Jaq Dionisio & Jomal Linao (Director: J. Pacena) (Winner)
 "Heartbreaker" – Mobbstarr (Director: Ace Villena)
 "Kaibigan Lang" (Remix) – Young JV

Favorite New Artist 
 Angeline Quinto
 Ebe Dancel
 Solenn
 Somedaydream
 Zia Quizon  (Winner)

Favorite Collaboration 
 "Meron Akong Ano" – Kamikazee Feat. Chito Miranda, Reg Rubio & Ian Tayao
 "One Hit Combo" – Parokya Ni Edgar Feat. Gloc-9 (Winner)
 "Pawiin" – Bbs Feat. Kean Cipriano & Jay Durias
 "Sari-Saring Kuwento" – Champ Feat. Noel Cabangon & Gloc-9
 "Walang Natira" – Gloc-9 Feat. Sheng Belmonte

Favorite Remake 
 "Fire" – Solenn
 "Forever Young" – Sam Concepcion
 "Gaano Ko Ikaw Kamahal" – Itchyworms
 "Love Moves In Mysterious Ways" – Christian Bautista Feat. Kris Aquino
 "Unbelievable" – Chicosci (Winner)

Favorite Media Soundtrack 
 "Bumuhos Man Ang Ulan" – Jericho Rosales (Green Rose)
 "Fallin'" – Sarah Geronimo (Catch Me, I'm in Love) (Winner)
 "I'm Already King" – Christian Bautista (A Special Symphony)
 "Kahit Walang Sabihin" – Rico Blanco (Imortal)
 "Where Do I Begin" – Gary Valenciano (In The Name Of Love)

Favorite Guest Appearance in a Music Video 
 Alodia Gosiengfiao ("All That's Left" – Christian Bautista)
 Enrique Gil ("Ako Na Lang" – Zia Quizon)
 Jasmine Curtis ("Hey Daydreamer" – Somedaydream)
 JM De Guzman ("Pangarap Lang Kita" – Parokya Ni Edgar Feat. Happee Sy)  (Winner)
 Kuya Kim & Eugene Domingo ("Wala Na Tayo" – Bbs Feat. Kean Cipriano)

Favorite Myx Celebrity VJ 
 Enchong Dee
 Kean Cipriano
 Rocksteddy
 Sam Concepcion
 Somedaydream (Winner)

Favorite Myx Live! Performance 
 Ebe Dancel
 Juris
 Kyla
 Parokya Ni Edgar (Winner)
 Pupil

Favorite International Video 
  "Born This Way" – Lady Gaga
  "Firework" – Katy Perry (Winner)
  "Moves Like Jagger" – Maroon 5 feat. Christina Aguilera
  "The Lazy Song" – Bruno Mars
  "What Makes You Beautiful" – One Direction

Favorite K-Pop Video 
 "Break Down" – Kim Hyun Joong
 "Neverland (U-KISS album)" – U-KISS
 "Mr. Simple" – Super Junior (Winner) 
 "The Boys" – Girls' Generation
 "Fiction (Beast song)" – Highlight (band)

Myx Magna Award 
 Ryan Cayabyab

External links 
 http://www.myxph.com/mma2012/
 http://www.myxph.com/mma2012/2/
 http://www.myxph.com/mma2012/3/

Philippine music awards
2012 music awards